Elections took place in Huron County, Ontario on October 24, 2022 in conjunction with municipal elections across the province.

Huron County Council
Huron County Council consists of the Mayors and Reeves of each constituent municipality, plus deputy mayors, deputy reeves for all municipalities except Howick, Morris-Turnberry and North Huron

Ashfield-Colborne-Wawanosh
The following were the results for mayor and deputy mayor of Ashfield-Colborne-Wawanosh.

Mayor
Glen McNeil was re-elected as mayor by acclamation.

Deputy mayor

Bluewater
The following were the results for mayor and deputy mayor of Bluewater.

Mayor
Incumbent mayor Paul Klopp was re-elected by acclamation for a second term.

Deputy mayor

Central Huron
The following were the results for mayor and deputy mayor of Central Huron.

Mayor

Deputy mayor

Goderich
The following were the results for mayor and deputy mayor of Goderich.

Mayor

Deputy mayor

Howick
Doug Harding was re-elected by acclamation as reeve of Howick.

Reeve

Huron East
The following were the results for mayor of Huron East.

Mayor

Morris-Turnberry
Jamie Heffer was re-elected mayor of Morris-Turnberry by acclamation.

Mayor

North Huron
Incumbent mayor Bernie Bailey was challenged by deputy reeve Trevor Seip. The following candidates are running for reeve of North Huron.

Reeve

South Huron
The following were the results for mayor and deputy mayor of South Huron.

Mayor

Deputy mayor

References

Huron
Huron County, Ontario